Interferon-induced guanylate-binding protein 2 is a protein that in humans is encoded by the GBP2 gene. GBP2 is a gene related to the superfamily of large GTPases which can be induced mainly by interferon gamma.

Localization 
GBP2 gene is located in a various compartment in the cell: nucleus, cytosol and cytoskeleton and also the dimer GBP2-GBP5 localise to the Golgi apparatus.

In addition, the Isoprenylation is required to regulate the intracellular localization and the membrane association of GBP2.

Activation 
The murine GBP2 gene is not just highly activated by the interferon-gamma during macrophages activation but also by the stimulation of Toll-like receptors, Tumor necrosis factor (TNF) and Interleukin 1 beta.

Expression 
After the stimulation of interferon gamma, GPB2 murine is expressed in the innate and adaptive immune cells.

Structure 
Sequence analysis of GBP2 showed the presence of an RNA binding domain which comprises a three RNA recognition motifs (RRM) and SR domain. The amino terminus of GBp2 shares a four Arg-Gly-Gly (RGG) repeat motifs and nine serine residues in the context of arginine/serine motifs.

The SR domain of GBP2 is a phosphorylation site for SR specific protein kinase SRPK (sky1) which lead a nuclear localization of GBP2.

The porcine GBP2 present a high similarity regarding the N-terminal which present a globular domain and contain the GTPase function. However, the C-terminal present a helical domain which is less conserved.

Interaction 
GBP2 gene can interact with the RNA via the domain RRM1 and RRM2. The RRM2 domain can recognize the core motif GGUC present in the RNA. Besides, a new type of RRM domain are identified and can interact with THO/TREX complex.

GBp2 gene can cooperate with TREX (transcription- export) complex; a multimeric complex has different transcription factor and exports factors such as Yra1 and Sub2.

Function 

Interferons are cytokines that have antiviral effects and inhibit tumor cell proliferation. They induce a large number of genes in their target cells, including those coding for the guanylate-binding proteins (GBPs). GBPs are characterized by their ability to specifically bind guanine nucleotides (GMP, GDP, and GTP). The protein encoded by this gene is a GTPase that converts GTP to GDP and GMP. In addition, GBP2 gene can be a relationship between cell surface receptor and intracellular effectors which can transmit extracellular information into the cells as well as an intracellular signal transduction protein.

A study on the bovine GBP2 gene showed the importance of GBP2 in the regulation of cell proliferation and the resistance to the pathogen infection such as an Exhibition of antiviral activity against influenza virus.

GPB2 Promote an oxidative killing and deliver antimicrobial peptides to autophagolysosomal, providing broad host protection against different pathogen classes. During a viral infection, GBPs Family(GBP1, GBP2 and GBP5) play a vital role to activate canonical and non-canonical inflammasome to response to a pathogen infection via chlamydia muridarum.

Clinical significance

Gene  Mutation 
A missense mutation of the GBP2 (A907G) has been identified in patients of a migraine. In the first step can lead to vasomotor dysfunction and then headaches.

Breast cancer 
GBP2 is considered as a control factor for the proliferation and spreading in the tumor cell. The high expression of GBP2 is associated with a better diagnosis of breast cancer. P53 can upregulate GBP2 and play an essential role in the tumor development by inhibition of metalloproteinase MM9 as well as NF-Kappa B and Rac protein.

The transcriptional level of GBP2 is also regulated by two transcription factor STAT1 and IRF1. GBP2 expression have a strong correlation with T cell metagene which seems an association with the infiltration of T cell in the breast cancer.

However, a recent study showed that GBP2 can regulate dynamin-related protein 1 (Drp1) to block the translocation of Drp1 to the mitochondria which lead to an attenuation of the Drp1 dependent mitochondrial fission and also an invasion of breast cancer cells.

References

Further reading